Sergei Aleksandrovich Zadelenov (born 27 February 1976 in Navapolatsk, Byelorussian SSR, Soviet Union) is a Belarusian professional ice hockey centre. He currently plays for HC Dynamo Minsk of the Kontinental Hockey League.

Zadelenov was selected for the Belarus national men's ice hockey team in the 2010 Winter Olympics.

Career statistics

Regular season and playoffs

International

External links

1976 births
Avtomobilist Yekaterinburg players
Belarusian ice hockey centres
Expatriate ice hockey players in Russia
HC Dinamo Minsk players
Khimik-SKA Novopolotsk players
HC Neftekhimik Nizhnekamsk players
Ice hockey players at the 2010 Winter Olympics
Living people
Olympic ice hockey players of Belarus
People from Navapolatsk
United Arab Emirates men's national ice hockey team coaches
Sportspeople from Vitebsk Region